The Venom Saga is a story arc from the 1994 animated series Spider-Man that focused on Venom. The description of the name and chosen episodes debuted in home media by Buena Vista Home Entertainment.  The first three episodes are the three-part episode entitled "The Alien Costume" from the first season. The last two are the two-part episode entitled "Venom Returns" and "Carnage", which debuted in the third season. These certain episodes are responsible for debuting the symbiotic characters Venom and Carnage outside of comic books. The arc was released on DVD as Spider-Man: The Venom Saga.

"The Alien Costume"

Production 
There were many difficulties with bringing Venom to television because everyone had different ideas for the Venom story. Len Wein wrote the first draft, which was rejected. In a later meeting the creative team came up with a scene by scene plot for the show. The show took a different approach to bringing the alien costume to Earth from the comic books. In this episode the alien costume is brought by a space shuttle, while in the comics, Spider-Man first wore the symbiote during the Secret Wars storyline on an alien planet called Battleworld, and later brought back to Earth. The ending of the second part is loosely based on Web of Spider-Man #1, in which Spider-Man removes the symbiote costume using the loud noise created by a church bell. The symbiote flees and merges with Eddie Brock, transforming him into Venom. This is a direct adaptation of the comics storyline.

John Semper took the idea of Eddie Brock following Spider-Man on a train in the third part from Alfred Hitchcock's Strangers on a Train.

"The Alien Costume" is the only three-part episode from the first season of the animated series Spider-Man. Venom was one of Spider-Man's most popular villains at the time this episode aired. Originally, this was going to be a two-part episode; however, the fans wanted to see more of the black costume, so a new second part was added into the middle of the episodes.

Part One 
John Jameson and fellow astronaut Paul Stevens discover a rock known as "Promethium X", which is said to be more powerful than plutonium. Unknown to the astronaut though, Promethium X also contains a mysterious element which manages to break free and tries to consume the two Astronauts. The space shuttle crashes on Manhattan Bridge, near the Hudson River, where Rhino is sent by The Kingpin to steal the Promethium X. Spider-Man arrives on the scene and manages to save Jameson and his fellow astronaut, yet unknown to Spider-Man, Eddie Brock is on the bridge too, and takes photos of him (and Rhino as well). However, when Jonah arrives on the scene, Eddie uses propaganda and frames Spider-Man for stealing something from the shuttle, which leads to a $1 million bounty on Spider-Man's head. However, Eddie deliberately does not mention to have seen Rhino at the scene also. Meanwhile, at home, Peter throws his costume in the garbage, as it is now useless to him. However, when he returned from the crash site, his suit carried what appeared to be "rich, thick, and creamy" Hudson River pollution. When Peter went to bed, the substance oozed over him and began to give him a nightmare and when he woke up, he found himself hanging from a building in a costume he had never seen before! This costume enhances Spider-Man's abilities. Meanwhile, Kingpin needed to gain some materials to test the power of Promethium X, he sent the Rhino to gain the necessary materials for his machine. Spider-Man managed to stop him, but almost lost himself to the power and tries to kill the Rhino. He eventually had to retreat back to the city, and ponder how the suit is changing him.

Part Two 

The story continues where it last left off, with the whole city hunting Spider-Man for Jonah's $1 million bounty. Spider-Man manages to fight them off until he is shot with a Sonic Blaster device, which weakens him. Despite this, Spider-Man manages to escape, and focuses his attention on Eddie Brock and Jonah Jameson and warns him to call off his reward, also mentioning Rhino and how Brock neglected to mention him. After Jonah visits his hospitalized son, Jameson finds out from him that Brock was lying and fires him. He also calls off the manhunt for Spider-Man.

Noticing another disturbing change in his behavior, Spider-Man seeks the assistance of Doctor Curt Connors, who studies the suit and realizes that it is a Symbiote. Spider-Man then uses the symbiote's powers to find a clue in Eddie's apartment, only to run into the Shocker, sent by The Kingpin to destroy the evidence Brock has of the crash site. The two fight, and Shocker gains the advantage, and flees, but Spider-Man follows him. Following Shocker leads him to Alistair Smythe and the Promethium X, which Spider-Man steals. Kingpin and Shocker form a plan to kidnap John Jameson in an attempt to gain the Promethium X back. Using John as bait, they manage to lure Spider-Man, to an old church. There the Shocker attacks Spider-Man, but is defeated. Eddie Brock tries to intervene, but is webbed up for his efforts. With Shocker at the mercy of Spider-Man, he begs for his life as Spider-Man is about to push him to his death. Spider-Man's conscience gets to him and he relents, only to have the symbiote push Shocker off the belltower, but Spider-Man uses two web lines to save him. Spider-Man, remembering how the symbiote was unusually weakened when he was earlier attacked with a Sonic Blaster, realizes that it is particularly sensitive to loud noises. Spider-Man then uses the church bells and the noise weakens the symbiote, and it sloughs off Peter and slinks weakly away. Peter Parker leaves, relieved to be away from the symbiote. Back at the Kingpin's headquarters, Smythe discovers why Spider-Man was so willing to trade the dangerous Promethium X back to them: as it turns out, Promethium X has an extremely short half-life, and in a matter of days it has already decayed into a harmless lump of lead. However, the symbiote was still alive and found a new host in Eddie Brock (who's cocooned by Spider-Man) and transformed him into his greatest unlikely friend and foe – Venom.

Part Three
Spider-Man had returned to his old costume. He soon came across The Rhino and The Shocker. While Spider-Man was able to easily defeat The Rhino, The Shocker managed to get the upper hand. However, an unknown 'ally' arrived and defeated the two villains himself. The new 'ally' proved to be Eddie Brock, who revealed himself as 'Venom'. Spider-Man attempted to reason with Brock, but Venom webbed up Spider-Man and removed the hero's mask high over a crowded street. Venom allowed Spider-Man to live, haunting his every step. Venom ruined a date with Mary Jane and menaced Spider-Man's aunt, so Spider-Man decided to fight back. He put some archives newspaper pages, featuring Brock's firing of Daily Bugle. He set a trap for the villain near the launch of a space shuttle. The noise from the rocket's afterburners forced the symbiote off of Brock, and Spider-Man webbed the creature to the rocket. The symbiote was blasted into space, and Eddie Brock was imprisoned at Ravencroft Asylum. At the episode's conclusion, Spider-Man (as Peter Parker) and Mary Jane regard the night sky and wonder what else might be up there. Venom's menacing face appears on the moon.

"Venom Returns" and "Carnage"

Production
"Venom Returns" and "Carnage" are the eleventh and twelfth episodes from the third season of the Spider-Man, also marking the thirty-eighth and thirty-ninth episodes.

"Venom Returns"
The symbiote returns to Earth and travels to Ravencroft to reunite with Eddie Brock, who then escapes as Venom. He is ordered by Dormammu, to whom the symbiote owes its earthly return, to steal a machine from Stark Enterprises capable of releasing Dormammu from his own far-off dimension. When Venom battles Spider-Man and War Machine, he is easily defeated by the two heroes. Baron Mordo and Dormammu help Eddie Brock's insane cell-mate Cletus Kasady bond with a symbiote, who later dubs himself Carnage. Carnage then assists Venom in his task to retrieve the technology from Stark Enterprises, though when Carnage attempts to destroy Spider-Man, Venom attacks him, telling him that Spider-Man is Venom's and Venom's only.

"Carnage"
When Venom refuses to continue to work for Dormammu, Carnage is considered sufficient to collect life-force which is essential for Dormammu to enter Earth. Carnage kidnaps Dr. Ashley Kafka, whom Eddie has fallen in love with. Eddie then reluctantly teams with Iron Man and Spider-Man to save her. They are forced to send Carnage as well as Dormammu into the other dimension, as it appears he has formed a link between himself and Carnage. Carnage, unwilling to leave Earth alone, attempts to drag Ashley with him, though Venom sacrifices himself for the woman he loves.

Cast

Main cast
Christopher Daniel Barnes – Spider-Man/Peter Parker 
Hank Azaria – Venom/Eddie Brock
Roscoe Lee Browne – The Kingpin/Wilson Fisk
Don Stark – The Rhino/Aleksei Mikhailovich Sytsevich 
Jim Cummings – The Shocker/Herman Schultz 
Maxwell Caulfield – Alistair Smythe
Robert Hays - Iron Man/Tony Stark
Ed Gilbert – Dormammu

Minor cast 
Ed Asner – J. Jonah Jameson 
Michael Horton – John Jameson 
Linda Gary – Aunt May 
Sara Ballantine – Mary Jane Watson 
Joseph Campanella – Doctor Curt Connors
James Avery - War Machine/Jim "Rhodey" Rhodes
Tony Jay – Baron Mordo

Reception

When the episodes were released in DVD as Spider-Man: The Venom Saga,  Filip Vukcevic of IGN stated that while Venom "would ultimately suffer from over-exposure and endure too many misinterpretations on the printed page, all of his viciousness remained intact on the TV show."

In other media

Film
The Venom Saga, as well as the comic book story arc "Maximum Carnage" (1993), would be primarily adapted for the basis for the plot of the 2021 film Venom: Let There Be Carnage.

References

Sources
 
Spider-Man: The Venom Saga [DVD]. Buena Vista Home Entertainment.

External links

1995 American television episodes
Spider-Man (1994 TV series)
Venom (character) in other media